Palaemon serrifer is a species of shrimp of the family Palaemonidae.

References

Crustaceans described in 1795
Palaemonidae